Bronislav Červenka (born 27 September 1975) is a Czech former football midfielder.

Playing career

Bronislav Červenka played for various top Czech football clubs before moving to Azerbaijan. While playing with Inter Baku in 2008, Červenka scored an equaliser for the club in their Champions League qualifier against FK Rabotnički.  He made two appearances in the Champions League that season.

References

External links 
 Profile at iDNES.cz
 Profile on Inter Baku's Official Site

1975 births
Living people
People from Luhačovice
Czech footballers
Czech Republic under-21 international footballers
Czech First League players
Association football midfielders
FC Baník Ostrava players
FC Fastav Zlín players
Shamakhi FK players
Czech expatriate footballers
Expatriate footballers in Azerbaijan
FK Drnovice players
Azerbaijan Premier League players
Sportspeople from the Zlín Region